D'ror Yikra (also spelled Dror Yikra, Deror Yikra and Dror Yiqra) is a piyyut (Jewish religious song or hymn), of the kind known as zemer, traditionally sung during Sabbath meals, particularly the first meal on Friday evening.

Dror Yikra was written in 960 CE in Córdoba by the poet, linguist, and musician Dunash ben Labrat, who is said to have been born in Fez but moved to Spain after a period of study in Baghdad under the rabbinic scholar Saadia Gaon.

According to the ArtScroll Siddur, "Dror Yikra" is "a plea to God to protect Israel, destroy its oppressors, and bring it peace and redemption."

Words
The poem consists of six four-line stanzas with the rhyme-scheme a a a a, b b b b, c c c c, etc. The wording varies slightly between manuscripts. The first three verses make up the song proper; each is signed with the acrostic DUNaSH. Many manuscripts continue with verse 4 or verses 4-5, which are not signed. MS Giessen 742, Add MS 27200, NY JTS 8092, and BUD 370 include verses 1-5 and then continue directly into another poem in a similar metre beginning "אדום עקר", which also completes the poem in abbreviated form in MS Parma 1721. The final verse in prayerbooks and MS Bod. 1100 is grafted from another of Dunash's poems, beginning "דלה שובב" and found in MS 27200, AIU H133, and some Geniza fragments. One Geniza fragment includes four stanzas of Devai Haser, then verses 2,3,1, and 4 (in that order) of Dror Yikra, but these are properly separate piyyutim.

Biblical references
The poem is full of Biblical references and quotations, sometimes adapted to suit the demands of the metre. For example, the opening words are based on Leviticus 25:10: "You shall proclaim release throughout the land" and Jeremiah 34:15: "Proclaim a release for them". "He will keep you as the apple (or pupil) of His eye" is based on Deuteronomy (32:10): "He engirded him, watched over him, guarded him as the pupil of His eye". "Pleasant is Your name" is based on Psalm 35:3: "Sing hymns to His name, for it is pleasant"; and "Repose, rest" comes from Numbers 22:19 ("sit and rest").

Interpretation
The poem has been commented on by such commentators as Rashi, Yosef Karo (Beit Yosef), Ya'akov Yosef HaKohen (Toldot Yaakov Yosef), and Yehuda Ayash (Mateh Yehuda).

Yehoshua Grant of the Hebrew University of Jerusalem has proposed that "Dror Yikra," on account of its incorporation of a new poetic tradition emerging out of Andalusia at the time, may be indicative of "the most important turning point...of medieval Hebrew poetry." Grant identifies three structural properties that suggest a synthesis of traditional and novel forms: the rhyme ending repeating four times in each stanza recalls a pattern commonly found in early Hebrew liturgical poetry; the acrostic manifestation of the author's name is similarly characteristic of an ancient tradition; the carefully measured meter, however, was unprecedented in the annals of Hebrew poetry.

Metre
The poem was unusual for the time since unlike previous piyyutim, its language is entirely Biblical, rather than a mixture of Biblical and later Hebrew. Secondly, Dunash was apparently the first Jewish poet to write Hebrew using Arabic quantitative metres (up to his time, Hebrew poetry had been based on stress, not on quantity). Dunash's two innovations caused a revolution in Jewish poetry and influenced all later poets.

The metre itself is the Arabic-Persian hazaj metre (called in Hebrew , ha-mishqal ha-marnin), which is based on a repeated rhythm of short-long-long-long (u – – –), a rhythm which it shares with the well-known Adon Olam. These days it is sung to two or three different tunes, not all of which, however, follow the rhythm of the metre.

Modern performances 
"Dror Yikra" is often sung to the tune of Simon & Garfunkel's "Scarborough Fair" and the Beach Boys' "Sloop John B."

The song has been covered extensively by various Israeli artists, among them the Parvarim, Yaffa Yarkoni, Bo'az Shar'abi, and Ofra Haza. At the 1999 Eurovision Song Contest in Jerusalem, transgender Israeli artist Dana International performed "Dror Yikra," despite threats from Orthodox Jews to disrupt the performance.

See also
Music of Israel
Jewish music

References

Bibliography
Rosenfeld-Hadad, Merav (2011)  Mishaf al-Shbahot - The Holy Book of Praises of the Babylonian Jews: One Thousand Years of Cultural Harmony between Judaism and Islam. In M.M. Laskier and Y. Lev. "The Convergence of Judaism and Islam: Religious, Scientific, and Cultural Dimensions''. University Press of Florida.

External links
Deror Yikra text, translation, notes (shituf.piyut.org)
Website of Hebrew liturgical melodies compiled by Mauro Braunstein. (D'ror Yikra is under "Shabbat dinner/Z'mirot".)
D'ror Yikra sung by Rabbi Batzri
D'ror Yikra sung to a Yemeni tune
D'ror Yikra sung by the Maccabeats to the tune of "Cups"
D'ror Yikra sung by The Parvarim

Hebrew-language literature
Jewish liturgical poems
Shabbat
Hebrew words and phrases in Jewish prayers and blessings